Grímsdóttir may refer to:
Vigdís Grímsdóttir (born 1953), Icelandic writer and teacher
Anna Grímsdóttir, fictional character from the Splinter Cell video game series